Retiniphyllum chloranthum is a species of flowering plant in the family Rubiaceae.

It occurs from Colombia to Guyana and northern Brazil.

It was described by Adolpho Ducke in 1943.

References

External links 
 World Checklist of Rubiaceae

Retiniphylleae
Flora of the Amazon
Flora of Brazil
Flora of Colombia
Flora of Guyana
Plants described in 1943
Taxa named by Adolpho Ducke